Athena Denise Cage (born May 6, 1970) is an American singer, producer and songwriter from Kentucky.

Early life and education
Athena Cage was born and raised in Russellville, Kentucky, United States. She was educated at Western Kentucky University.

Philanthropy and community service
In 2003, Cage established "The Athena Cage Scholarship Fund" at Western Kentucky University, her alma mater. The money for the scholarship was raised through a concert series. At the second concert of the series in 2004, she teamed up with Dionne Warwick.

Honors
She was also bestowed with the title Kentucky Colonel by Ernie Fletcher, the Governor of Kentucky. In 2004, Second Street in Russellville, where she grew up, was renamed to "Athena Cage Way" to honor her community work, youth service and efforts to restore the Old Logan Theater.

Discography

Albums
2001: The Art Of A Woman (Unreleased)

Singles

References

External links
 

Living people
Western Kentucky University alumni
People from Russellville, Kentucky
1970 births
American contemporary R&B singers
African-American women singer-songwriters
Singer-songwriters from Kentucky
Kentucky women musicians
Singers from Kentucky
21st-century American women singers
American soul singers
21st-century African-American women singers
20th-century African-American people
20th-century African-American women